Levi Bouwense (born 27 June 2000) is a Dutch footballer who played as a midfielder for Sparta Rotterdam. In the 2020–21 season he played for Almere City FC. In February 2021 he signed to join ASWH in the summer of 2021. In 2022, he signed with VV Katwijk.

Career statistics

Club

References

2000 births
Living people
Dutch footballers
Netherlands youth international footballers
Association football midfielders
Sparta Rotterdam players
Eerste Divisie players
Tweede Divisie players
ASWH players
Almere City FC players